Kotagiri Venkateswara Rao is an Indian film editor, who works primarily in Telugu cinema.

Personal life
His ancestors worked as Diwans for Zamindars. He hails from Nuzvid, Krishna district, Andhra Pradesh. He has three elder brothers and two elder sisters. The eldest of them is Kotagiri Gopala rao. His father died early leaving the family in a miserable condition. Gopal rao took control of the family and shifted to Madras. He has become an editor under the eminent director Adurthi Subba Rao and 10 others.

Venkateswara Rao did not want to do editing after completing matriculation. But due to compulsion from his brother, He joined his brother in Madras and trained as an editor. K. Raghavendra Rao gave him the first chance to edit three songs in his film Adavi Ramudu in 1977.

Awards

Nandi Awards
 2004: Sye - Won the Nandi Award for Best Editor
 2005: Subhash Chandra Bose - Won the Nandi Award for Best Editor
 2007: Yamadonga - Won the Nandi Award for Best Editor
 2009: Magadheera - Won the Nandi Award for Best Editor
 2010: Darling - Won the Nandi Award for Best Editor
 2012: Eega - Won the Nandi Award for Best Editor
 2014: Legend - Won the Nandi Award for Best Editor

Santosham Film Awards 

 2015: Baahubali: The Beginning & Srimanthudu - Won the Santosham Best Editing Award

Vijay Awards
 2012: Naan E - Won the Vijay Award for Best Editor

Filmography

Telugu

 Adavi Ramudu (1977) 
 Vetagadu (1979)
 Abhilasha (1983)
 Apoorva Sahodarulu (1986)
 Kondaveeti Raja (1986)
 Dharmapatni (1987)
 Alluda Majaka (1995)
 Raja Kumarudu (1999)
 Vamsi (2000)
 Student No. 1 (2001)
 Indra (2002)
 Raghavendra (2003)
 Gangotri (2003)
 Simhadri (2003)
 Palnati Brahmanayudu (2003)
 Adavi Ramudu (2004)
 Sye (2004)
 Balu ABCDEFG (2005)
 Naa Alludu (2005)
 Subhash Chandra Bose (2005)
 Narasimhudu (2005)
 Chatrapati (2005)
 Jai Chiranjeeva (2005)
 Devadasu (2006)
 Vikramarkudu (2006)
 Chinnodu (2006)
 Khatarnak (2006)
 Okka Magadu (2007)
 Yamadonga (2007)
 Rechipo (2009)
 Raju Maharaju (2009)
 Magadheera (2009)
 Maryada Ramanna (2010)
 Darling (2010)
 Simha (film) (2010)
 Jai Bolo Telangana (2011)
 Seema Tapakai (2011)
 Kandireega (2011)
 Rajanna (2011)
 Naa Ishtam (2012)
 Neeku Naaku Dash Dash (2012)
 Dammu (2012) 
 Adhinayakudu (2012)
 Endukante...Premanta! (2012)
 Eega (2012)
 Devudu Chesina Manushulu (2012)
 Sarocharu (2012)
 Mirchi (2013)
 Legend (2014)
 Rabhasa (2014)
 Malli Malli Idi Rani Roju (2015)
 Baahubali: The Beginning (2015)
 Srimanthudu (2015)
 Lacchimdeviki O Lekkundi (2015)
 Sarrainodu (2016)
 A Aa (2016)
 Brahmotsavam (2016)
 Janatha Garage (2016)
 Premam (2016)
 Radha (2017)
 Nene Raju Nene Mantri (2017)
 Baahubali 2: The Conclusion (2017)
 Jaya Janaki Nayaka (2017)
 Ungarala Rambabu (2017)
 Jai Lava Kusa (2017)
 Mahanubhavudu (2017)
 Balakrishnudu (2017)
 2 Countries (2017)
 Chalo (2018)
 Naa Peru Surya (2018)
Saakshyam (2018)
Nartanasala (2018)
Savyasachi (2018)
Agnyaathavaasi (2018)
Bhaagamathie (2018)
 Juvva (2018)
 Mahanati (2018)
 Sailaja Reddy Alludu (2018)
 Vinaya Vidheya Rama (2019)
 Sita (2019)
 Prati Roju Pandage (2019)
 World Famous Lover (2020)
 Palasa (2020)
 Induvadana (2022)
 Radhe Shyam (2022)
 Sita Ramam (2022)

See also
Indian film editors

References

External links
 

Living people
Telugu people
Telugu film editors
Year of birth missing (living people)
Tamil film editors
Film editors from Andhra Pradesh
People from Krishna district
Nandi Award winners
Santosham Film Awards winners